Wendy Margaret Tuckerman (born 5 October 1964) is an Australian politician. She has been a member of the New South Wales Legislative Assembly since 2019, representing Goulburn for the Liberal Party.  She was formerly an unsuccessful candidate for National Party preselection for the 2017 Cootamundra state by-election. Tuckerman has served as the Minister for Local Government in the Perrottet ministry since December 2021.

Tuckerman was formerly mayor of Boorowa and then the Administrator for Hilltops Council, following which she became a councillor at the elections for merged councils.  She has a background in the Australian Federal Police.

References

 

1964 births
Living people
Liberal Party of Australia members of the Parliament of New South Wales
Members of the New South Wales Legislative Assembly
Women members of the New South Wales Legislative Assembly
Australian police officers
21st-century Australian politicians
21st-century Australian women politicians